Nola Records was an American independent record label based in New Orleans.

Overview 
The label was established in the summer of 1963 by composer and bandleader, Wardell Quezergue along with music producer Clint Scott and Ulis Gaines. The name ‘’’Nola’’’ is short for New Orleans, Louisiana which is the term commonly used to describe the City. Bonatemp Records and Hot Line Records were its subsidiary labels.

Nola recorded and released records under production of Quezergue. The first record from the label that gathered attention was “It Ain’t My Fault”, a tune by session drummer Joe “Smokey” Johnson. This record was leased to Vee-Jay Records for national distribution.

The label’s biggest hit was “Barefootin’” by Robert Parker released in 1966 which climbed to No. 7 in the Billboard Hot 100 and No. 2 in the Billboard R&B chart. 

Other artists on the label included Curley Moore (“Soul Train”), Willie Tee (“Teasin’ You”), Earl King (subsidiary label Hot Line), and Eddie Bo.

References

External links 
 Discogs: Nola Records

American record labels
Blues record labels
Record labels established in 1963
Record labels disestablished in 1968
Rhythm and blues record labels
Soul music record labels
Record labels based in Louisiana
Companies based in New Orleans